Frank Nicolas Piasecki (October 24, 1919 – February 11, 2008) was an American engineer and helicopter aviation pioneer. Piasecki pioneered tandem rotor helicopter designs and created the compound helicopter concept of vectored thrust using a ducted propeller.

Early life and education
Born in Philadelphia, Pennsylvania, to an immigrant Polish tailor, Piasecki worked for autogyro manufacturers while still attending Overbrook High School, then studied mechanical engineering at the University of Pennsylvania before graduating with a bachelor's degree from New York University. He was employed by the Platt-LePage Aircraft Company as a control engineer on their XR-1 twin-rotor project. In 1940, he formed PV Engineering Forum with former Pennsylvania classmate Harold Venzie. He built a single-person, single-rotor helicopter designated the PV-2 and flew it on April 11, 1943.  This helicopter impressed the United States Navy sufficiently to win Piasecki a development contract.

Career

The name PV Engineering was changed to Piasecki Helicopter Corporation in 1946. After a boardroom dispute, Piasecki was forced out of Piasecki Helicopter in 1955, and formed the Piasecki Aircraft Company.

At Piasecki Aircraft, he participated in the development of the Piasecki 16H-1 the world's first shaft driven compound helicopter, the PA-59K/VZ-8P Flying Geep (also known as the AirGeep) the Piasecki PA-97 Helistat heavy vertical airlifter and the Piasecki X-49 experimental compound helicopter.

Personal life
Piasecki married Vivian Weyerhaeuser on December 20, 1958.  They had seven children: Nicole, Frederick, John, Lynn, Frank, Michael, and Gregory.

His son John W. Piasecki is now President and CEO of Piasecki Aircraft.  His son Fred W. Piasecki is Chairman of the Board and Chief Technology Officer of Piasecki Aircraft. His daughter Nicole Piasecki was the vice president and general manager of Propulsion Systems for Boeing Commercial Airplanes.

Later life and death
Piasecki died at his home on February 11, 2008, of a heart attack after a series of strokes. He was 88.

Awards
 Philip H. Ward, Jr. Medal from The Franklin Institute in 1979.
 National Medal of Technology - President Ronald Reagan presented Piasecki with the country's highest technical honor in 1986.
 Smithsonian National Air and Space Museum Lifetime Achievement award - awarded in 2005
 National Aviation Hall of Fame Inducted 2002.

See also

 Boeing Helicopters
 List of Polish Americans

References

External links
Founder Origins: Frank Nicholas Piasecki
Exclutive Biography of Frank N. Piasecki
The Boy Who Grew Flying Bananas by L.B. White 1951 article on Piasecki at age 31 and his early helicopters. Rare photos.
Frank Piasecki biography on National Aviation Hall of Fame site
 Summary of Frank's aviation legacy from AIN online

1919 births
2008 deaths
Businesspeople from Philadelphia
American people of Polish descent
American aerospace engineers
Aviation pioneers
Aviation inventors
Businesspeople in aviation
20th-century American inventors
National Medal of Technology recipients
Commanders of the Order of Merit of the Republic of Poland
20th-century American businesspeople
University of Pennsylvania alumni
New York University alumni